Helen Lynch (April 6, 1900 – March 2, 1965) was an American silent film actress, mainly known for her roles playing gun molls and other morally dubious characters.

Biography
Lynch was born in 1900 in Billings, Montana, where she was also raised. When she was one year old, her father died, and Lynch was raised along with her sister, Agnes, by their mother, Christian Fraser. When she was 9 years old, the family relocated to Hollywood, California, which at the time was a small suburb of Los Angeles situated amongst orchards. 

After working as a film extra, Lynch was chosen as one of thirteen WAMPAS Baby Stars in 1923. During her career, she was mostly cast in comedies, and often portrayed gun molls and other controversial female characters.

She acted in a number of films throughout the 1920s and four small roles in the 1930s. It appears she returned one last time to the screen in the 1940 film Women Without Names.

She was married to actor Carroll Nye.

Lynch died in 1965 in Miami Beach, Florida.

Filmography

 Honor Bound (1920)
 The House That Jazz Built (1921)
What's a Wife Worth? (1921)
 My Lady Friends (1921)
Live and Let Live (1921)
Midnight (1922)
Minnie (1922)
 Fools First (1922)
 The Other Side (1922)
 Glass Houses (1922)
The Eternal Three (1923)
 Cause for Divorce (1923)
The Dangerous Age (1923)
The Meanest Man in the World (1923)
The Tomboy (1924)
 The Valley of Hate (1924)
 American Manners (1924)
 On Probation (1924)
Oh Doctor! (1925)
Three Weeks in Paris (1925)
 Smilin' at Trouble (1925)
 Bustin' Thru (1925)
After Marriage (1925)
 Smouldering Fires (1925)
Fifth Avenue Models (1925)
 Three Weeks in Paris (1925)
Return of Grey Wolf (1926)
 My Own Pal (1926)
The Arizona Sweepstakes (1926)
 Speeding Through (1926)
 Tom and His Pals (1926)
General Custer at the Little Big Horn (1927)
Underworld (1927)
Avenging Fangs (1927)
 Cheaters (1927)
 Husbands for Rent (1927)
Love and Learn (1928)
The Showdown (1928)
The Singing Fool (1928)
 In Old Arizona (1928)
 Ladies of the Mob (1928)
 Thundergod (1928)
 Romance of the Underworld (1928)
Stolen Love (1928)
Speakeasy (1929)
 Why Bring That Up? (1929)
 City Girl (1930)
 Emergency Call (1933)
 Elmer and Elsie (1934)
 Hell-Ship Morgan (1936)
Women Without Names (1940)

References

External links

American film actresses
American silent film actresses
1900 births
1965 deaths
People from Billings, Montana
Actresses from Montana
20th-century American actresses
WAMPAS Baby Stars